Boțești is a commune in Vaslui County, Western Moldavia, Romania. It is composed of four villages: Boțești, Gănești, Gugești and Tălpigeni.

References

Communes in Vaslui County
Localities in Western Moldavia